Diamond Sun is the second album by Canadian band Glass Tiger. The album was certified triple platinum in Canada and featured the single "I'm Still Searching", which peaked at #2 in Canada.

Track listing

Personnel

Glass Tiger
 Alan Frew - vocals
 Sam Reid - keyboards
 Al Connelly - guitars
 Wayne Parker - electric bass
 Michael Hanson - drums, additional guitars

Additional musicians
 Backing Vocals: Dalbello, Arnold Lanni, Sheree Jeacocke, Colina Phillips
 Additional Guitars: Keith Scott
 Additional Drums and Keyboards: Jim Vallance
 Additional Fretless Bass: Rene Worst
 Saxophone: Earl Seymour
 Synclavier Programming: John Grier
 Guitar Technician: Tony Lester

Production
 Management: Derek Sutton (Los Angeles, California), Gary Pring, and Joe Bamford (Toronto, Ontario, CA)
 Recording: Jim Vallance, Randy Staub, Tom Henderson, and Brian Masterson
 Mixing: Ed Thacker
 Assistance: Randy Staub, Paul Milner, Glen Robinson, Darren Millar, Joe Mancuso, and Ciaran Byrne
 Producing on Track 6: Sam Reid
 Mastering: Bob Ludwig at Masterdisk, NY
 Tour Sound: Tracy Silverstone
 Stage Sound: Greg Grace
 Tour Lighting: Steve Baird
 Art Direction, Design, and Sculpture: Heather Brown
 Photography: Douglas Brown
 Group Photography: Alison Wardman

Certifications

Notes 

1988 albums
Glass Tiger albums
Capitol Records albums
Albums recorded at Le Studio